Benipatti Assembly constituency is an assembly constituency in Madhubani district in the Indian state of Bihar.

Overview
As per Delimitation of Parliamentary and Assembly constituencies Order, 2008, No. 32. Benipatti Assembly constituency is composed of the following: Kaluahi community development block; Bishunpur, Basaitha, Behata, Bankata, Pali, Parsauna, Dhagjara, Barhampura, Akaur, Nagwas, Naokarhi, Chatra, Parkhauli Tikuli, Anrer South, Anrer North, Paraul, Parjuar Dih, Dhanga, Mureth, Nagdah Balain, Kapasia, Barri, Shahpur, Meghben, Benipatti, Ganguli and Kataia gram panchayats of Benipatti CD Block.

Benipatti Assembly constituency is part of No. 6. Madhubani (Lok Sabha constituency).

Members of Legislative Assembly

Election results

2020

References

External links
 

Assembly constituencies of Bihar
Politics of Madhubani district